Carteriospongia foliascens is a species of sea sponge in the family Thorectidae. Carteriospongia foliascens hosts an exceptionally diverse variety of microbial life, mainly Candidatus Synechococcus.

References

External links 
https://peerj.com/articles/1435/
https://link.springer.com/article/10.1007/s00248-014-0419-0
 

Dictyoceratida
Animals described in 1766
Taxa named by Peter Simon Pallas